"Would've, Could've, Should've" is a song by American singer-songwriter Taylor Swift. It is a bonus track released as part of the 3am Edition of her tenth studio album, Midnights (2022). Written and produced by Swift and Aaron Dessner, it is a new wave-leaning soft rock song about a narrator's rumination about a flawed, age-inappropriate romantic relationship in the past. Music critics highly praised the lyrics, production, and emotional sentiments of the song, with some picking it as an album highlight. The song was included in 2022 year-end best-of lists by Business Insider, Rolling Stone, and Slant Magazine. It peaked at number 20 on the US Billboard Hot 100, number 21 on the Billboard Global 200, and charted in Canada, the Philippines, Portugal, Sweden, and Vietnam.

Background and composition 
On August 28, 2022, Swift announced her tenth studio album Midnights during her acceptance speech when she won Video of the Year for All Too Well: The Short Film at the 2022 MTV Video Music Awards. The 13-track album was released at midnight on October 21, 2022, Eastern Time, on Republic Records. Three hours later, Midnights (3am Edition), which features seven additional songs, including "Would've, Could've, Should've", was surprise-released.

Swift wrote and produced "Would've, Could've, Should've" with Aaron Dessner, who plays numerous instruments for the track including bass guitar, electric guitar, acoustic guitar, harmonica, synthesizer, and piano. Other musicians include Bryce Dessner (electric guitar), James McAlister (drums, synthesizer), Bryan Devendorf (drums), and Thomas Barlett (keyboards, synthesizer). The track's production features steadily building acoustic guitar, synthesizers, and distortion. Callie Ahlgrim from Business Insider described the genre as soft rock, and Rolling Stone considered it a new wave-leaning song. In The Oregonian, Lizzy Acker found the track containing "an almost-country vibe". Commenting on the production, USA Today's Melissa Ruggieri said it features "a galloping cadence and soaring chorus".

In the lyrics, a narrator ruminates about a past relationship with an older man when she was 19 years old and how it still haunts her into adulthood. The narrator reflects on the relationship, "I damn sure never would've danced with the devil at 19 / And the God's honest truth is that the pain was heaven / And now that I'm grown, I'm scared of ghosts." She examines how the trauma turned her memories into weapons ("I regret you all the time"), but also admits how it used to entertain her ("the God's honest truth is that the pain was heaven"). Religious references are prevalent ("You're a crisis of my faith" and "The tomb won't close, stained glass windows in my mind").

The bridge contains the lyric that some critics found striking and most cutting, "Living for the thrill of hitting you where it hurts / Give me back my girlhood, it was mine first", accusing the man of stealing her innocence, and abusing her emotionally and sexually. Many critics viewed "Would've, Could've, Should've" as a loose sequel to Swift's 2010 song "Dear John", as both are about a teenage girl dealing with a relationship with an older man. Rob Sheffield from Rolling Stone considered "Would've, Could've, Should've" "messier, more confused, more ambivalent". In Slate, Carl Wilson said the song finds Swift "returning to stories that feel familiar, but with second thoughts".

Reception 
Many critics considered "Would've, Could've, Should've" the best track on the 3am Edition of Midnights, with some commenting that it even outshines the 13 tracks on the standard edition and questioning Swift's decision to include it as a bonus track. A few agreed with the song's status as a 3am Edition-only track because it stands out production-wise; Variety journalist Chris Willman added that the painful lyrics might tarnish the rather playful Midnights. Wilson called the song a "killer" with intense lyrics that feel like "where she stays inside the house as it burns". Quinn Moreland from Pitchfork picked it as one of the best songs of Swift's career, praising the nuanced, mature perspective compared to the 2010 track "Dear John". In The Atlantic, Shirley Li commented that despite the media gossip surrounding the subject behind "Would've, Could've, Should've", the track would stand the test of time thanks to its emotional sentiments. Acker was less complimentary, deeming the track not as fun as other Midnights songs. The song was ranked in year-end lists of the best songs of 2022 by Business Insider (1st), Slant Magazine (24th), and Rolling Stone (59th).

"Would've, Could've, Should've" debuted and peaked at number 20 on the US Billboard Hot 100. On the Billboard Global 200, it peaked at number 21. The track peaked on singles charts including the Canadian Hot 100 (18), the Portuguese singles chart (66), the Philippines Songs chart (23), and the Billboard Vietnam Hot 100 chart (96).

Credits and personnel 
Credits are adapted from Tidal.

 Taylor Swift –  vocals, songwriting, production
 Aaron Dessner – songwriting, production, bass guitar, drum programming, drums, electric guitar, guitar, harmonica, piano, synthesizer, recording engineering
 Bryce Dessner – electric guitar
 James McAlister – drum programming, drums, synthesizer
 Bryan Devendorf – drums
 Thomas Bartlett – keyboards, synthesizer, additional engineering
 Jonathan Low – mixing, recording engineering, vocal engineering
 Randy Merrill – mastering
 Bella Blasko – recording engineering
 Justin Vernon – additional engineering

Charts

References 

2022 songs
American soft rock songs
Taylor Swift songs
Songs written by Taylor Swift
Songs written by Aaron Dessner
Song recordings produced by Taylor Swift
Song recordings produced by Aaron Dessner